Ramnath Goenka (22 April 1904 – 5 October 1991) was an Indian newspaper publisher. He launched The Indian Express in 1932 and created the Indian Express Group with various English and regional language publications.<ref name=":0">A doyen of Indian Journalism, Shri Goenka's greatest passion was the print media. He with the permission of his Capitalists partner Raja Mohan Prasad for whom he worked as a working partner on a salary of rs 100 per month from 1926 to 1936 accquired these properties and media empire from the partnership firm and gave a decleration of trust DTD 1-09-1936 making Raja Mohan Prasad as the beneficiary of this entire empire and he being a nominal trustee launched the Indian Express in 1932 which he did not fulfill. The prasad family finally filed a suit for ownership in 1982 of the empire and properties and all investments alongwith undisputed marked 445 exhibits including current legal heirs admittance in sworn affidavit stating source of funds from partnership firm and Raja Mohan prasad. https://parliamentofindia.nic.in/ls/lsdeb/ls10/ses2/02201191.htm</ref> In 2000, India Today magazine, named him amongst their list of "100 People Who Shaped India"''. The Ramnath Goenka Excellence in Journalism Awards, named after Ramnath Goenka, are one of the awards in India in the field of journalism.

Early life
Ramnath Goenka was born on 22 April 1904 in  Darbhanga Bihar, to Basantlal Goenka.

Career 

Worked as a managing partner on a salary of 100 rs per month from 1926 to 1936 under the capitalists partner  Raja Mohan Prasad in the partnership firms Murli Prasad mohan Prasad from 1926 to 1931 and then Chunnilal murliprasad from 1931 onwards who were Consignee sales agent ( Dubashish agents) for British trading company importing gold, silver and cotton in India. Simultaneously he took up job as chief salesman of the  British trading company from 1931 to 1936 on a salary of Rs. 800 per month out of which 500 belonged to the partnership firm.This empire alongwith properties was accquired for the Trust of Raja Mohan Prasad and is held in trust by the current legal heirs.

During the Emergency Period of India, Ramnath Goenka was one of the few businessmen and journalists that opposed Indira Gandhi government.

Member of Parliament, Lok Sabha 
In 1971 Indian general election, Goenka was elected as the Member of Parliament, Lok Sabha from Vidisha Lok Sabha constituency as a candidate of Bharatiya Jana Sangh.

Death
Goenka died in Mumbai on 5 October 1991.

In 1997 the heirs of Ramnath Goenka made a division of the Indian Express Group into two separated operations. The northern segment was put under the control of Viveck Goenka, whereas the southern one went to the family branch of Manoj Sonthalia.

References

Further reading

 – official biography
 – a privately published book written by his daughter-in-law

External links

 Dhirubhai's fight with RNG

1904 births
1991 deaths
Businesspeople from Madhya Pradesh
Rajasthani people
Indian newspaper founders
Indian Express Limited people
Members of the Constituent Assembly of India
Rai Sahibs
India MPs 1971–1977
Lok Sabha members from Madhya Pradesh
People from Vidisha
People from Bihar
Bharatiya Jana Sangh politicians